The First Battle of Kiev was the German name for the operation that resulted in a huge encirclement of Soviet troops in the vicinity of Kiev (present-day Kyiv) during World War II. This encirclement is considered the largest encirclement in the history of warfare (by number of troops). The operation ran from 7 July to 26 September 1941, as part of Operation Barbarossa, the Axis invasion of the Soviet Union.

Much of the Southwestern Front of the Red Army (commanded by Mikhail Kirponos) was encircled, but small groups of Red Army troops managed to escape the pocket days after the German panzers met east of the city, including the headquarters of Marshal Semyon Budyonny, Marshal Semyon Timoshenko and Commissar Nikita Khrushchev. Kirponos was trapped behind German lines and was killed while trying to break out.

The battle was an unprecedented defeat for the Red Army, exceeding even the Battle of Białystok–Minsk of June–July 1941. The encirclement trapped 452,700 soldiers, 2,642 guns and mortars, and 64 tanks, of which scarcely 15,000 had escaped from the encirclement by 2 October. The Southwestern Front suffered 700,544 casualties, including 616,304 killed, captured, or missing during the battle. The 5th, 37th, 26th, 21st, and 38th armies, consisting of 43 divisions, were almost annihilated and the 40th Army suffered many losses. Like the Western Front before it, the Southwestern Front had to be recreated almost from scratch.

Prelude

July
After the rapid progress of Army Group Centre through the central sector of the Eastern front, a huge salient developed around its junction with Army Group South by late July 1941. On 7–8 July 1941, the German forces managed to break through the fortified Stalin Line, in the southeast portion of Zhytomyr Oblast, which ran along the 1939 Soviet border. By 11 July 1941, the Axis ground forces reached the Dnieper tributary Irpin River ( to the west from Kiev). The initial attempt to enter the city right away was thwarted by troops of the Kiev ukrep-raion (KUR, Kiev fortified district) and counter offensive of 5th and 6th armies. Following that the advance on Kiev was halted and main effort shifted towards the Korosten ukrep-raion where the Soviet 5th Army was concentrated. At the same time the 1st Panzer Army was forced to transition to defense due to a counteroffensive of the Soviet 26th Army. A substantial Soviet force, nearly the entire Southwestern Front, positioned in and around Kiev was located in the salient. By the end of July, the Soviet front lost some of its units due to the critical situation of the Southern Front (6th and 12th armies) caused by the German 17th army.

While lacking mobility and armor, due to high losses in tanks at the Battle of Uman, on 3 August 1941, they nonetheless posed a significant threat to the German advance and were the largest single concentration of Soviet troops on the Eastern Front at that time. Both Soviet 6th and 12th armies were encircled at Uman, where some 102,000 Red Army soldiers and officers were taken prisoner. On 30 July 1941, the German forces resumed their advance onto Kiev, with the German 6th army attacking positions between the Soviet 26th army and the Kiev ukrep-raion troops.

August
On 7 August 1941, their advance was halted again by the Soviet 5th, 37th, and 26th armies, supported by the Pinsk Naval Flotilla. With the help of the local population around the city of Kiev, anti-tanks ditches were dug and other obstacles were installed, including the establishment of 750 pillboxes and 100,000 mines planted along the  frontline segment. Some 35,000 soldiers were mobilized from local population along with some partisan detachments and two armored trains.

On 19 July, Adolf Hitler had issued Directive No. 33, which cancelled the assault on Moscow in favor of driving south to complete the encirclement of Soviet forces surrounded in Kiev. On 12 August 1941, Supplement to Directive No. 34 was issued. This directive represented a compromise between Hitler, who was convinced the correct strategy was to clear the salient occupied by Soviet forces on right flank of Army Group Center, in the vicinity of Kiev, before resuming the drive to Moscow, and Franz Halder, Fedor von Bock and Heinz Guderian, who advocated an advance on Moscow, as soon as possible. The compromise required 2nd and 3rd Panzer Groups of Army Group Centre, which were redeploying in order to aid Army Group North and Army Group South respectively, be returned to Army Group Centre, together with the 4th Panzer Group of Army Group North, once their objectives were achieved. Then the three Panzer Groups, under the control of Army Group Center, would lead the advance on Moscow. Initially, Halder, chief of staff of the Oberkommando des Heeres (OKH), and Bock, commander of Army Group Center, were satisfied by the compromise, but soon their optimism faded as the operational realities of the plan proved too challenging.

On 18 August, the OKH submitted a strategic survey (Denkschrift) to Hitler, regarding the continuation of operations in the East. The paper made the case for the drive to Moscow, arguing once again that Army Groups North and South were strong enough to accomplish their objectives without any assistance from Army Group Center. It pointed out that there was enough time left before winter to conduct only a single decisive operation against Moscow.

On 20 August, Hitler rejected the proposal based on the idea that the most important objective was to deprive the Soviet Union of its industrial areas. On 21 August, Alfred Jodl of Oberkommando der Wehrmacht (OKW) issued a directive, which summarized Hitler's instructions, to Walther von Brauchitsch, commander-in-chief of the Army. The paper reiterated that the capture of Moscow, before the onset of winter, was not a primary objective. Rather, that the most important missions before the onset of winter were to seize the Crimea, and the industrial and coal region of the Don River; isolate the oil-producing regions of the Caucasus from the rest of the Soviet Union, and in the north, to encircle Leningrad, and link up with the Finns. Among other instructions, it also instructed that Army Group Center is to allocate sufficient forces to ensure the destruction of the "Russian 5th Army" and, at the same time, to prepare to repel enemy counterattacks in the central sector of its front. Hitler referred to the Soviet forces in the salient collectively as the "Russian 5th Army". Halder was dismayed, and later described Hitler's plan as "utopian and unacceptable", concluding that the orders were contradictory and Hitler alone must bear the responsibility for inconsistency of his orders and that the OKH can no longer assume responsibility for what was occurring; however, Hitler's instructions still accurately reflected the original intent of the Barbarossa directive of which the OKH was aware all along. Gerhard Engel, in his diary for 21 August 1941, simply summarized it as, "it was a black day for the Army". Halder offered his own resignation and advised Brauchitsch to do the same. Brauchitsch declined, stating Hitler would not accept the gesture, and nothing would change anyhow. Halder withdrew his offer of resignation.

On 23 August, Halder convened with Bock and Guderian, in Borisov, in Belorussia, and afterwards flew with Guderian to Hitler's headquarters in East Prussia. During a meeting between Guderian and Hitler, with neither Halder nor Brauchitsch present, Hitler allowed Guderian to make the case for advancing on to Moscow, and then rejected his argument. Hitler claimed his decision to secure the northern and southern sectors of western Soviet Union were "tasks which stripped the Moscow problem of much of its significance" and was "not a new proposition, but a fact I have clearly and unequivocally stated since the beginning of the operation." Hitler also argued that the situation was even more critical because the opportunity to encircle the Soviet forces in the salient was "an unexpected opportunity, and a reprieve from past failures to trap the Soviet armies in the south." Hitler also declared, "the objections that time will be lost and the offensive on Moscow might be undertaken too late, or that the armoured units might no longer be technically able to fulfil their mission, are not valid." Hitler reiterated that once the flanks of Army Group Center were cleared, especially the salient in the south, then he would allow the army to resume its drive on Moscow; an offensive, he concluded, which "must not fail". Guderian returned to the 2nd Panzer Group and began the southern thrust in an effort to encircle the Soviet forces in the salient.

The bulk of the 2nd Panzer Group and the 2nd Army were detached from Army Group Centre and sent south. Its mission was to encircle the Southwestern Front, commanded by Semyon Budyonny, in conjunction with the 1st Panzer Group, of Army Group South, under Paul Ludwig Ewald von Kleist, which was advancing from a southeasterly direction.

Following the crossing of the Dnieper river by German forces on 22 August 1941, the city of Kiev came under threat of encirclement. The command of the Southwestern Front appealed to the Stavka to allow for a withdrawal of forces from Kiev.

September
The Red Army Chief of Staff, Boris Shaposhnikov, wrote a letter to the Southwestern Front on September 17, authorising a withdraw from Kiev, when the encirclement was already completed at Lokhvytsia, in Poltava region.

Battle

The Panzer armies made rapid progress. On 12 September, Ewald von Kleist's 1st Panzer Group, which had by now turned north and crossed the Dnieper river, emerged from its bridgeheads at Cherkassy and Kremenchuk. Continuing north, it cut across the rear of Semyon Budyonny's Southwestern Front. Budyonny was now trapped and soon relieved by Joseph Stalin's order of 13 September, and Budyonny was replaced by Semyon Timoshenko, in command of the Southwestern Direction.

After that, the fate of the encircled Soviet armies was sealed. With no mobile forces or supreme commander left, there was no possibility to effect a breakout. The infantry of the German 17th and 6th Armies, of Army Group South, soon arrived, along with the 2nd Army, also on loan from Army Group Center, and marching behind Guderian's tanks. They systematically began to reduce the pocket, assisted by the two Panzer armies. The encircled Soviet armies at Kiev did not give up easily. A savage battle in which the Soviets were bombarded by artillery, tanks, and aircraft had to be fought before the pocket had finally fallen.

By 19 September, Kiev had fallen, but the encirclement battle continued. After 10 days of heavy fighting, the last remnants of troops east of Kiev surrendered on 26 September. Several Soviet armies, namely the 5th, 37th, and 26th, were now encircled, as well as separate detachments of 38th and 21st armies. The Germans claimed to have captured 600,000 Red Army soldiers (up to 665,000), although these claims have included a large number of civilians suspected of evading capture.

During withdrawal from Kiev, on 20–22 September 1941, at Shumeikove Hai, near Dryukivshchyna, (today in Lokhvytsia Raion) several members of headquarters staff were killed, including Mikhail Kirponos (commander), Mykhailo Burmystenko (a member of military council), and Vasiliy Tupikov (chief of staff). Some 15,000 Soviet troops managed to break through the encirclement.

Aftermath

By virtue of Guderian's southward turn, the Wehrmacht destroyed the entire Southwestern Front east of Kiev during September. It inflicted nearly 700,544 casualties on the Red Army, while Soviet forces west of Moscow conducted many attacks on Army Group Centre. Although most of these attacks failed, the Soviet attacks in the Yelnya Offensive succeeded with the German forces abandoning the town, and resulted in the first major defeat for the Wehrmacht in Operation Barbarossa. With its southern flank secured, Army Group Center launched Operation Typhoon, in the direction of Vyazma, in October.

Over the objections of Gerd von Rundstedt, Army Group South was ordered to resume the offensive and overran nearly all of the Crimea and Left-bank Ukraine before reaching the edges of the Donbas industrial region. However, after four months of continuous operations, his forces were at the brink of exhaustion, and suffered a major defeat in the Battle of Rostov. Army Group South's infantry fared little better and failed to capture the vital city of Kharkov, before nearly all of its factories, skilled laborers, and equipment were evacuated east of the Ural Mountains.

Despite the order for wholesale destruction of Kiev issued in the Supplement to Directive 34 from 12 August, the city was spared, to Hitler's fury, as there had been no fighting within. The German troops, who occupied Kiev on 19 September, were surprised by a series of explosions from Soviet radio-mines in the city centre from 24 September onwards, the first of which also killed a number of local civilians reporting at the German Field Command to surrender outlawed items. The resulting fire, which was not put out until 29 September, offered the Nazi authorities a pretext to commence the mass murder of Jews in Babi Yar on the same day. As the city had not been razed, the German leadership launched the plan to starve it while officially attributing the food shortages to the consequences of Soviet economic policies. Ultimately the implementation of the Hunger Plan in occupied Kiev was restrained by the fears of an uprising behind the lines, and the city was only forcibly evacuated and subjected to widespread looting and burning during the German withdrawal in September–November 1943.

Assessment

Immediately after World War II ended, prominent German commanders argued that had operations at Kiev been delayed, and had Operation Typhoon been launched in September, rather than October, the German Army would have reached and captured Moscow before the onset of winter. 

David Glantz argued that had Operation Typhoon been launched in September, it would have met greater resistance due to Soviet forces not having been weakened by their offensives east of Smolensk. The offensive would have also been launched with an extended right flank. Glantz also claims that regardless of the final position of German troops when winter came, they would have still faced a counteroffensive by the 10 reserve armies raised by the Soviets toward the end of the year, who would also be better equipped by the vast industrial resources in the area of Kiev. Glantz asserts that had Kiev not been taken before the Battle of Moscow, the entire operation would have ended in a disaster for the Germans.

See also

Babi Yar
Battle of Uman
Battle of Białystok–Minsk
Battle of Kiev (1943)
Yelnya Offensive
Anglo-Soviet invasion of Iran

References

Sources

Further reading

External links

Conflicts in 1941
1941 in Ukraine
Battle of Kiev
Encirclements in World War II
Battles and operations of the Soviet–German War
Battles of World War II involving Germany
Battles involving the Soviet Union
Military history of Kyiv
August 1941 events
September 1941 events